Lieutenant General Nils Axel Hjalmar Björk (25 February 1898 – 15 April 1989) was a senior Swedish Army officer. He served as Commanding General of the VI Military District from 1951 to 1963.

Early life
Björk was born on 25 February 1898 in Västerås, Sweden, the son of Axel Björk, a master tailor, and his wife Anna (née Nilsson). He passed studentexamen in Västerås in 1916.

Career
Björk was commissioned as an officer in 1918 and was assigned as a second lieutenant to Västmanland Regiment (I 18). He was promoted to lieutenant in 1920 and attended the Royal Swedish Army Staff College from 1925 to 1927 and transferred to Västernorrland Regiment (I 21) in 1928 after I 18 was disbanded. Björk served as captain in the General Staff in 1931. Björk was military expert in the 1930 Defense Commission (1930 års försvarskommission) from 1933 to 1936. Björk was one of the contributors to Antingen – eller ("Either – Or"), which was of fundamental importance for the rearmament work and the Defence Act of 1936. He served in Svea Life Guards in 1937 and became major in the General Staff Corps in 1938. Björk succeeded lieutenant colonel Carl August Ehrensvärd as head of Army Operations Department in the Defence Staff in 1939 and in this position had the immediate responsibility for the planning of the extensive operational contingency measures for the Swedish Army during the war years 1939–1942. In 1940, Björk was a member of the Home Guard Investigation Committee. In 1941 he became lieutenant colonel in the General Staff Corps. During this time, Björk also served as a representative of the Swedish Armed Forces in the national board of the Swedish Red Cross from 1939 to 1942.

Björk served in Värmland Regiment (I 2) in 1942 and was promoted to colonel in 1942 and then served as commander of Norrbotten Regiment (I 19) from 1942 to 1946. In 1944, he served as chief of the Evacuation Staff during the evacuation from northern Finland in 1944. Björk served as commander of Skaraborg Regiment (P 4) from 1946 to 1948. He was then colonel in the General Staff Corps and head of Section 2 of the Army Staff from 1948 to 1951 when he was promoted to major general. Björk then served as Commanding General of the VI Military District from 1951 to 1963 when he retired and was promoted to lieutenant general on the reserve list.

Personal life
In 1922, Björk married Margit Borgman (1899–1970), the daguhter of agronomist Gösta Borgman and Sigrid (née Rundberg). He was the father of the daughters Barbro (born 1924) and Hervor (born 1925).

Dates of rank
1918 – Second lieutenant
1920 – Lieutenant
1931 – Captain
1938 – Major
1941 – Lieutenant colonel
1942 – Colonel
1951 – Major general
1962 – Lieutenant general

Awards and decorations
   Commander Grand Cross of the Order of the Sword (6 June 1958)
   Commander of the Order of Vasa
   Knight of the Order of the Polar Star
   Swedish Central Federation for Voluntary Military Training Medal of Merit in gold
   Swedish Women's Voluntary Defence Organization Royal Medal of Merit in gold
   Home Guard Medal of Merit in gold
  Swedish Red Cross Medal of Merit (Svenska Rödakorsets förtjänstmedalj)
  (Befälsutbildningsförbunds förtjänstmedalj i silver)
  Norrbotten Association for Volunteer Military Training in gold (Norrbotten befäls(utbildnings)förbunds guldmedalj)
  Norrbotten Shooting Association's gold medal (Norrbottens skytteförbunds guldmedalj)
  Central Board of the National Swedish Rifle Association's silver medal (Sveriges skytteförbunds överstyrelses silvermedalj)

Foreign
   Grand Cross of the Order of St. Olav (1 July 1961)
   Commander of the Order of the White Rose of Finland
   3rd Class of the Order of the Cross of Liberty with swords
  Finnish Population Protection Merit of Merit, 1st class with clasp (Finlands Befolkningsskydds förtjänstmedalj, 1:a klass med spänne)
  Finnish Commemorative Medal for Humanitarian Activities (Finsk minnesmedalj för humanitär verksamhet)

Honours
Member of the Royal Swedish Academy of War Sciences (1944)
Member of the Royal Skyttean Society (1957)

Bibliography

References

1898 births
1989 deaths
Swedish Army lieutenant generals
People from Västerås
Members of the Royal Swedish Academy of War Sciences
Commanders Grand Cross of the Order of the Sword
Commanders of the Order of Vasa
Knights of the Order of the Polar Star